In algebraic topology, several types of products are defined on homological and cohomological theories.

The cross product

The cap product

The slant product

The cup product

This product can be understood as induced by the exterior product of differential forms in de Rham cohomology. It makes the singular cohomology of a connected manifold into a unitary supercommutative ring.

See also
Singular homology
Differential graded algebra: the algebraic structure arising on the cochain level for the cup product
Poincaré duality: swaps some of these
Intersection theory: for a similar theory in algebraic geometry

Algebraic topology
Homology theory
Operations on structures

References
Hatcher, A., Algebraic Topology, Cambridge University Press (2002) , especially chapter 3.